Bainbridge–Ropers syndrome is a very rare genetic disorder characterized by abnormalities including severe psychomotor development, feeding problems, severe postnatal growth delays, intellectual disabilities, and skeletal abnormalities.

Signs and symptoms

Morphological features of this syndrome include:
 Arched eyebrows
 Anteverted nares
 Ulnar deviation of the hands
 Microcephaly
 Skeletal abnormalities, such as a "barrel chest", extremely high arched palate
 Crowded teeth
 Hypertelorism (wide-set eyes)
 Scoliosis

Genetics
This condition is caused by a mutation in the ASXL3 gene, which is considered a de novo mutation.

Genetic changes that are described as de novo (new) mutations can be either hereditary or somatic. In some cases, the mutation occurs in a person's egg or sperm cell but is not present in any of the person's other cells. In other cases, the mutation occurs in the fertilized egg shortly after the egg and sperm cells unite. (It is often impossible to tell exactly when a de novo mutation happened.) As the fertilized egg divides, each resulting cell in the growing embryo will have the mutation. De novo mutations may explain genetic disorders in which an affected child has a mutation in every cell in the body but the parents do not, and there is no family history of the disorder.

This condition is inheritable.

Mutations in the Additional Sex Combs Like 3 (ASXL3) gene on the long arm of chromosome 18 (18q12.1) have been associated with this condition.

Diagnosis
Diagnosis can only be made by genetic testing.

Differential diagnosis

Bohring–Opitz syndrome

Treatment

There is no currently known treatment or cure for this condition. However, the symptoms can be treated.

History

This condition was first described by Bainbridge et al in 2013.

References

External links 

Rare genetic syndromes
Autosomal dominant disorders